Masao Adachi (足立正生 Adachi Masao, born May 13, 1939) is a Japanese screenwriter, director, actor and former Japanese Red Army member who was most active in the 1960s and 1970s. He was born in Fukuoka Prefecture.

Career
Best known for his writing collaborations with directors Kōji Wakamatsu and Nagisa Oshima, often under the pseudonyms "Izuru Deguchi" or "De Deguchi" (出口出),  he also directed a number of his own films, usually dealing with left-wing political themes. Adachi was a prominent director in the Japanese New Wave film movement, producing pink films alongside documentaries. He stopped making films in the early 1970s and joined the Japanese Red Army. 

He resided in Lebanon for 28 years, lending assistance to the Popular Front for the Liberation of Palestine until he was arrested and extradited back to Japan in 2000 due to his connections to the JRA. After being held for a year and a half he was convicted and released based on the time he had already served. Since his release, he has resumed making films.

Adachi directed REVOLUTION+1, a film based on the assassination of former Prime Minister Shinzo Abe in 2022, focusing on a fictionalized version of the suspect Tetsuya Yamagami. On 27 September, the day of Abe's state funeral, a special 50-minute version of the film was shown in small theatres across Japan. The film was to be screened at a total of 13 theatres, but one theatre cancelled its screening after receiving a series of threatening phone calls and emails. The full-length film is scheduled to be completed in November 2022.

Partial filmography

References

Bibliography

Masao Adachi and Go Hirasawa, Film / Revolution, 2003,  河出書房新社 (in Japanese).
Masao Adachi, Le Bus de la révolution passera bientôt près de chez toi. Ecrits sur le cinéma, la guérilla et l'avant-garde, Rouge Profond éditeur, 2012 (in French)
Eric Baudelaire, The Anabasis of May and Fusako Shigenobu. Masao Adachi, and 27 years without images, installation for the MACBA in Barcelona, 2011, text in English and Catalan, film 66 min (in English) and nine screenprints.

External links 
 
 
 
 
 
 
 

1939 births
Living people
Japanese counterfeiters
Japanese film directors
People from Fukuoka Prefecture
Writers from Fukuoka Prefecture
Japanese Red Army